Sulabh International is an India-based social service organization that works to promote human rights, environmental sanitation, non-conventional sources of energy, waste management and social reforms through education. The organization counts 50,000 volunteers.  Sulabh International is the largest nonprofit organization in India.

History
Sulabh was founded by Bindeshwar Pathak from Bihar State in 1970, and have 50,000 volunteers Innovations include a scavenging-free two-pit pourflush toilet (Sulabh Shauchalaya); safe and hygienic on-site human waste disposal technology; a new concept of maintenance and construction of pay-&-use public toilets, popularly known as Sulabh Complexes with bath, laundry and urinal facilities being used by about ten million people every day and generates bio-gas and biofertilizer produced from excreta-based plants, low maintenance waste water treatment plants of medium capacity for institutions and industries. Other work includes setting up English-medium public school in New Delhi and also a network of centres all over the country to train boys and girls from poor families, specially scavengers, so that they can compete in open job market.

Institution

The United Nations Centre for Human Settlements has praised Sulabh's sanitation system as a global "Urban Best Practice" at the Habitat-II conference held at Istanbul, Turkey, in June 1996. The Economic and Social Council of the United Nations granted Special Consultative Status to Sulabh in recognition of its work.

Sulabh claims their plan on human waste disposal and social reforms has provided jobs directly to 35,000 people, and has created 10,000,000 (1 crore) man-days, making 240 towns scavenging free.

Sulabh has established coordination with various national and international agencies, including British Council, USAID, BORDA, a German organisation, Commission of European Union, Belgium, GERES, France, CEEIC, HRIEE, China and Haskoning and Euroconsult, a Dutch firm.

Sulabh found mention in page 124 of the Human Development Index report for 2006. Sulabh was commended for bringing sanitation to the poor in India.

In October 2007, Sulabh announced the design of a cheap toilet system that recycles human waste into biogas and fertilizer.

Pathak has been conferred with the 2009 Stockholm Water Prize for his contributions towards his work. Sulabh International awarded Gandhi Peace Prize for year 2016 jointly with Akshaya Patra Foundation in 2019.

Sulabh International Museum of Toilets 

In Sulabh International's premises in Delhi, the company runs a museum dedicated to the history of sanitation and toilets.

Criticism 
The organization has been criticised by Mukul Sharma in his book Caste and Nature: Dalits and Indian Environmental Politics (2017). Sharma writes that the Brahmin and Gandhian activist Bindeshwar Pathak employs patronising and glorifying methods while dealing with caste based occupation like manual scavenging and sanitation work in general.

References

External links
 
 Sulabh International
 Energy International - NGO which constructs sulabh shauchalaya in rural and urban areas internationally
 Film on Sulabh: Scavenging Freedom, includes interview with founder, Total Running Time: 43 mins
 Nai Disha: Film on Scavengers of Alwar, Total Running Time: 7 mins
 The Sanitary Visionary and Me (a profile of Sulabh and Bindeshwar Pathak)

Waste organizations
Water supply and sanitation in India
Environmental organisations based in India
Recipients of the Gandhi Peace Prize